The Cosby Show is an American television sitcom starring Bill Cosby, which aired for eight seasons on NBC from 1984 until 1992. The show focuses on the Huxtable family, an upper middle-class African-American family living in Brooklyn, New York.

Main characters

Cliff Huxtable

Dr. Heathcliff "Cliff" Huxtable is known for his comical antics, playful admonishments, and relentless teasing humor. He lives in Brooklyn Heights, New York. Cliff had a brother, James Theodore Huxtable, who died of rheumatic fever at the age of 7. In his high school and college years, he was an athlete who wrestling, played American football, and ran track and field. He later served in the Navy before going to medical school. He is an obstetrics and gynaecology who runs a practice from the office annexed to his home. In the show, most characters outside of family and friends refer to him as "Dr. Huxtable", and he is well-respected in the community.

Cliff is married to Clair Huxtable. Both Cliff and Clair attended the fictional Hillman College. Together, they have five children: Sondra, Denise, Theodore (Theo), Vanessa, and Rudith (Rudy). Cliff enjoys live jazz, has an extensive collection of albums, and tries to eat junk food whenever he can get away with it.

Cliff is very eccentric and silly to most people around him, especially his family, however he is very kind-hearted and an extremely dedicated father with a strong sense of humor. Although he and his wife fostered a tight-knit, loving family, a running gag throughout the series is his thwarted attempts to get the grown children to leave the house.

Very playful, Cliff enjoys competition, often making bets with Clair over various things, such as the date a certain jazz song was released, or having a "Smooth Contest" to see which of them looked more elegant for a night on the town, as judged by the children. He also plays a monthly game of pinochle against his father and some friends, which sometimes gets very passionate. Unfortunately, Cliff often finds himself on the losing end of most of his bets and games, as, for example, he has never beaten his father-in-law at chess. However, Cliff eventually broke his losing streak at pinochle against his father and his friend Homer Dobson with the help of Dr. Foster (played by Roscoe Lee Browne), an expert pinochle player who also happened to be his and Clair's literary professor at Hillman College.

In the pilot episode, Cosby's character's full name is Clifford, as shown on a sign on the exterior of the house. His full name was subsequently changed to Heathcliff, even though in one episode Clair called him "Heathclifford", and he is commonly called "Cliff" throughout the series.

Originally, Cliff was to have worked as a chauffeur, with most of the humor coming from his interactions with customers. However, the show was changed before airing to have Cliff be a medical doctor, and the humor to come from his interactions with his family.

Cliff also appears in three episodes of A Different World: the pilot (with Rudy), "Rudy and the Snow Queen" (also with Rudy) and "If Chosen, I May Not Run".

He is the only character to appear in every episode.

Clair Huxtable 

Clair Olivia Huxtable (née Hanks) is the elegantly tough, eloquent, and engaging wife of Cliff, who is known for her relaxed confidence and striking emphasis as shown. Aside from her deep and decorated self-expression, Clair can also be playful and silly. She is an intelligent, classy, and successful businessperson. A great debater, Clair rarely if ever loses an argument on the show, a testament to her career as lawyer. She is also highly skilled in areas of recall about facts and dates, which she uses during discussions and debates: in one episode she is shown quoting a passage and even the page number of a book during an appearance at a television roundtable. Clair is multilingual, speaking Spanish on a couple of occasions and once speaking Portuguese with one of Theo's teachers. Several episodes also showcased her singing talent. Despite her elegant brand of toughness and strictness, Clair is a very loving mother and wife. Her catchphrase during the series run is “Let the record show”. The character is loosely based upon Cosby's wife, Camille Cosby.

Her age is directly stated only once during the series, and two separate episodes provide contradictory information on the age difference between herself and Cliff. He celebrates his 50th birthday during season three ("Cliff's 50th Birthday"), while she celebrates her 46th during season five ("Birthday Blues," two years later), indicating that she is six years younger. However, in the season four episode "The Locker Room," it is stated that Clair is four years younger.

Her character was originally supposed to be a housewife, but when the show finally aired, she became a lawyer. During the series, she becomes a partner in her law firm. As an attorney she helps her family with legal issues, and she successfully represents her eldest daughter, Sondra, in a case over dishonest car repairs. When it came to the Huxtable household, she was in charge, even though she let Cliff think he was in charge (although Cliff was known to lay down the law when he had to). She was the chief disciplinarian of the children, as shown in an episode where Vanessa and her friends sneak off to Baltimore to see a rock concert and Clair delivers a scathing diatribe to her.

Clair also appears in four episodes of A Different World: "Clair's Last Stand", "Risky Business" (with Theo and Vanessa), "Forever Hold Your Peace" (with Martin and Olivia) and "Success, Lies and Videotapes".

Clair Huxtable has been ranked highly in several lists of the top television mothers. She was voted as television's "Favorite TV Mom" in a poll conducted by the Opinion Research Company in 2004. In 2009, she was included in the Top 5 Classic TV Moms by Film.com. In May 2012, Clair was one of the 12 moms chosen by users of iVillage on their list of "Mommy Dearest: The TV Moms You Love". AOL named her the ninth Most Memorable Female TV Character.

It's worth noting that Clair shares a maiden name with Camille Cosby, Bill's wife.

Sondra Huxtable 

Sondra Tibideaux (née Huxtable), the eldest daughter of Cliff and Clair, did not appear on screen until mid-way through season one. She did not exist in the pilot episode (Clair: "Why do we have four children?" Cliff: "Because we did not want five.") In her first appearance, she is a sophomore in college, and Cliff notes her to be 20 years old (episode 10). She earned a degree from Princeton University and had intentions of pursuing a career as a lawyer, like her mother. She married her boyfriend, Elvin Tibideaux, in season four, and later gave birth to twins—a boy and a girl—named after Nelson and Winnie Mandela. More serious, earnest and responsible than the other children, Sondra fits many of the characteristics of the first born from a large family. Though she had her moments of bizarre thinking (e.g. dropping out of law school to open up a wilderness store with Elvin), she'd usually snap out of them relatively quickly. Because of her intelligence level and overachieving nature, she is looked upon by her parents proudly, but also is held to a higher standard than the rest of the children. Sondra appeared sporadically in early seasons of the series due to the character being off at college at the time.

Sondra was created when Bill Cosby wanted the show to express the accomplishment of successfully raising a child (e.g. a college graduate). Whitney Houston was considered for the role of Sondra Huxtable. Sabrina LeBeauf almost missed out on the role because she is only 10 years younger (b. 1958) than Phylicia Rashad (b. 1948).

The character is loosely based upon Cosby's eldest daughter, Erika, who was approximately the same age as Sondra.

Denise Huxtable 

Denise Kendall (née Huxtable)  is the second daughter of Cliff and Clair Huxtable. At the beginning of the series, she is sixteen years old. She loves fashion and music, but did not want to attend school to pursue either interest. She is noted as being an individual who usually wishes to march to the beat of her own drum, and often learns lessons up front for herself rather than based on the experiences of others. A two-year stint at Hillman College ends with Denise wishing to see what she can accomplish on her own, which leads her to Africa as a photographer's assistant.  While there, she meets and marries Navy Lt. Martin Kendall, and also becomes stepmother to Martin's three-year-old daughter Olivia, his child from a previous marriage. Denise eventually decides to become a special education teacher and makes arrangements to attend Medgar Evers College to this effect, but that idea does not work out as Denise eventually leaves New York again when Martin is posted to Singapore on a long-term assignment. It is revealed in the series finale that she is pregnant.

During the first two seasons, Denise was portrayed as a very popular high-schooler, with many friends, who seemingly had a different boyfriend every episode. Along with her constantly fluctuating love life, were her various hairstyles and choices of clothing, which were occasionally made fun of by Cliff. In later seasons, however, she exhibited a more flighty nature, often expressing ideas that left Cliff and Clair greatly puzzled.

In season three, Denise left home to attend Hillman College, a fictional, historically Black colleges and universities, of which her mother, father and grandfather were all alumni. The Cosby Show's producers created a spin-off series, entitled A Different World, which initially dealt with the life of Denise at college. Denise was written out of the series following its inaugural season (which aired concurrently with season four of The Cosby Show), after actress Lisa Bonet became pregnant. Shortly after the start of season five, Denise traveled to Africa for a year, and there she fell in love with and married Martin. In the season six premiere, she returned home, shocking her parents with the news of her surprise marriage to a divorced single father. However, Cliff and Clair accepted the couple when they met Olivia, who immediately won their hearts and was welcomed into the family. She appears regularly during the first three seasons, and is in only four episodes each of seasons four and five (a picture of her can be seen in the opening credits of season four), she appears regularly in season six, but only appears in a handful of episodes during season seven.

The character is loosely based upon Cosby's daughter, Erinn, who was approximately the same age as Denise. Additionally, Denise attended Hillman College, whereas Erinn attended Spelman College, the university that Hillman is believed to be modeled after.

Theo Huxtable 

Theodore Aloysius "Theo" Huxtable is the middle child and only son of Cliff and Clair Huxtable, and is athletic and obsessed with impressing girls, and obtaining a sports car or motorcycle. He is fourteen years old when the series begins. In the pilot episode, he is lectured by his father for not applying himself at school ("I brought you in this world, and I'll take you out"). Also in the early seasons, he was somewhat of a troublemaker, as illustrated through incidents both alluded to and explicitly portrayed in the series, such as letting his best friend's younger sister pierce his ear, resulting in an infected earlobe, but his behavior had improved by the time he left high school.

A running theme of the early seasons revolved around Theo's academic struggles, especially in his sophomore-year geometry class, taught by Mrs. Westlake (Sonia Braga). As the seasons progressed, Theo gradually evolved from being an under-achiever to a successful high school—and college—student (in interviews, Cosby noted a similar change in his real-life son, Ennis). While Theo was a student at New York University, it was revealed that he suffered from dyslexia, a learning disability that inspired him to work harder, and as a result overcame it. By the final season, Theo was a student teacher, helping other children with dyslexia at a local education center. In the show's final episode, he graduated from New York University with a degree in psychology.

In the pilot, and once more in season one (the episode "Bad Dreams"), he is referred to by Vanessa as "Teddy", instead of "Theo."

Theo has a long-running, but on-and-off relationship with a girl named Justine, who is mentioned many times throughout the series, but appears in only nine episodes. During his high school years, Theo's best friend was Walter Bradley (Carl Anthony Payne II), better known as "Cockroach", who was more of a scholastic underachiever than Theo, although when an argument Theo and his parents culminated into a mock trial, Cockroach was the one who presented convincing facts which closed the "case". The two of them would occasionally compose rap songs for various school assignments. When Theo got tickets to "Dance Mania" (a "Soul Train"-like television dance show), and only one of them was allowed into the studio, Theo let Cockroach have the spot, but did not feel good about it when he saw Cockroach on TV, and as the center of their friends' attention the next day at school. This episode marked the final appearance of the character, and Cockroach was rarely mentioned in subsequent episodes. Theo appears in the series the most out of the Huxtable children.

The character is loosely based upon Cosby's only son Ennis, who was approximately the same age as Theo (and was also dyslexic).

Theo also appears in two episodes of A Different World: "My Dinner With Theo" (with Rudy) and "Risky Business" (with Clair and Vanessa).

Vanessa Huxtable 

Vanessa Huxtable is the fourth child and third daughter of Cliff and Clair. In season one, she is eleven years old. As Vanessa grows up, she faces typical teenage problems and heartbreaks, such as wearing make-up before her 15th birthday in violation of her parents' rules and spending a lot of time talking on the phone with her friends. Unlike her older brother, she is an excellent student and seems to enjoy school; at the beginning of season seven, she went off to college one year early. She became engaged in the final season to Dabnis Brickey, a man in his late twenties. Dabnis is the head of maintenance at Lincoln University in Pennsylvania, where Vanessa enrolls. However, Vanessa realizes that she is not ready to get married, and they break off the engagement. They maintain they are "just friends" by the end of the season.

In the early seasons, Vanessa is usually considered to be nosy, as she usually—sneakily—tries to find out what goes on in the Huxtable house, especially when it involves someone (usually Theo) in trouble with their parents. But, in a later episode, the tables are turned, as Theo catches Vanessa's friends smoking cigarettes in her room, although Vanessa herself did not take part, and even tried to dissuade her friends from doing so.

She often fights with her younger sister, Rudy, over typical childish issues. At one point, their fighting caused damage to both their bedrooms and the kitchen ceiling, driving Cliff to declare their rooms off limits because of "World War Five" and exile them to the basement until repairs were finished. But, on one occasion, Vanessa gets into a physical tussle with Denise over a sweater that Vanessa stole from Denise's closet after Denise did not allow her to borrow it.

One of Vanessa's best friends in high school is a girl named Kara (played by Elizabeth Narvaez), who rambles on about nothing in particular at high speed. Whenever Cliff—who once referred to Kara as "Turbo Tongue"—is on the receiving end of her babbling, he usually replys with a bewildered "Thank you." Vanessa appeared sporadically in the final two seasons of the series due to the character being away at college.

The character is loosely based upon Cosby's daughter, Ensa, who was approximately the same age as Vanessa.

Vanessa also appears in the A Different World episode "Risky Business" (with Clair and Theo).

Rudy Huxtable 

Rudith Lillian "Rudy" Huxtable is the youngest of the Huxtable children. She is only five years old at the beginning of the series. She comes of age during the course of the show.

A number of Rudy's friends appear in episodes as the series progresses. Among the best known are the taciturn Peter Chiara who repeatedly runs out the Huxtables' front door when frightened; and the chauvinist, blues-loving Kenny, whom she nicknames "Bud", and who always gets advice from his unseen older brother about most things. This gives him the wrong conception about certain things and gets him in trouble, although he seems to grow out of it as the series reaches its end.

Keshia Knight Pulliam was nominated for a Primetime Emmy Award for her performance in season two, becoming the youngest nominee ever. One of her fellow nominees that year was Lisa Bonet. Neither won, as they lost to Rhea Perlman from Cheers.

The Huxtable family was originally going to be two boys and two girls. The youngest child, Rudy, was initially supposed to be a boy, but the character was re-written for a girl (Keshia Knight Pulliam) when there was a lack of boys auditioning. Jaleel White, later known for his role as Steve Urkel on Family Matters, revealed in a 2011 interview with Vanity Fair that he had auditioned for the role of Rudy.

The character is loosely based upon Cosby's youngest daughter, Evin, who was approximately the same age as Rudy.

Rudy also appears in three episodes of A Different World: the pilot (with Cliff), "Rudy and the Snow Queen" (also with Cliff) and "My Dinner with Theo" (with Theo).

Elvin Tibideaux 

Elvin Tibideaux is Sondra's boyfriend, and later, husband. They met at Princeton University, where they both earn degrees. The two constantly bicker during early episodes, until his interactions with the Huxtables, particularly Clair, challenge him to confront his "male-chauvinist" attitudes.

When they return from their honeymoon, they shock Cliff and Clair by announcing their intentions to forego medical school and law school, and start a wilderness supply store in Brooklyn. When their children are born, Elvin announces that he will re-apply to medical school. This decision later convinces Sondra to resume her studies at law school.

Elvin was a wrestler in high school and for one year at Princeton University, but had to quit after injuring his hip. During season three, he helps Theo with some strategy and moves.

Martin Kendall 

Lt. Martin Kendall is a United States Navy officer, husband of Denise Huxtable, and father of Olivia. Martin Kendall is introduced to the Huxtables after Denise unexpectedly marries him in Africa, unbeknownst to the family. When the newlyweds arrive back home, Martin learns that Denise's family not only does not know about their marriage, they do not know about him at all. This does not go over smoothly at first, as Clair and Cliff are uneasy with the whirlwind marriage of Martin, however in due time they become accustomed to this blended family. Kendall also had an ex-wife, named Paula (played by Victoria Rowell). In the finale, it is revealed that he and Denise are expecting a baby together.

Joseph C. Phillips played Sondra's date in a season two episode, a different character than Martin. Martin appears frequently in the sixth season but is only seen in a handful episodes of the seventh season, Phillips's final season as a regular. Martin makes his final appearance in an episode of season eight, "Olivia Comes Out of the Closet".

Martin also appears in the Different World episode "Forever Hold Your Peace" (with Clair and Olivia).

Olivia Kendall 

Olivia Kendall is Denise Huxtable's precocious stepdaughter, who is three years old when she first appears in the series. Olivia is the only child of Martin and Paula Kendall. After a few years of marriage, her parents divorced, and her mother, Paula, gave Martin full custody, as she felt overwhelmed by marriage and motherhood. Olivia was then raised by her grandparents and father.

When Olivia is almost four years old, her father Martin marries Denise Huxtable, whom he met in Africa. The new family moves in with Denise's parents, Clair and Cliff Huxtable, who are now Olivia's step-grandparents. Martin, as a Naval officer, is required to travel a lot, so for a while, Olivia is unable to spend time with him. During his absences, Denise raises her. Olivia continues to live with her step-grandparents while her parents are in Singapore during the final season.

The character was named after Bill Cosby's wife, Camille Olivia Hanks-Cosby.

Olivia also appears in the Different World episode "Forever Hold Your Peace" (with Clair and Martin).

Pam Tucker 

Pam Tucker is Clair Huxtable's distant cousin. The daughter of a single mother, Pam comes to live with the Huxtables after her mother moved to California to take care of Pam's grandmother. Upon moving in, Pam is a high school junior—younger than Vanessa, but older than Rudy. At first, she is not used to the Huxtables' upper-middle-class lifestyle or close-knit family relationships. Eventually, she fits in, and becomes just another one of the Huxtable clan. Pam makes her first appearance in the fourth episode, "A Period of Adjustment", in season seven.

Frequently, Pam is shown interacting with her best friend, Charmaine Brown (Karen Malina White), and Charmaine's boyfriend, Lance Rodman (Allen Payne).

The character had a mixed reception.

Recurring characters 
 Russell Huxtable (Earle Hyman) Cliff's father (40 episodes)
 Kenny, aka "Bud" (Deon Richmond) Rudy's longtime friend (32 episodes)
 Anna Huxtable (Clarice Taylor) Cliff's mother (19 episodes)
 Nelson Tibideaux (Christopher & Clayton Griggs, Darrian & Donovan Bryant, Gary LeRoi Gray) son of Sondra and Elvin (18 episodes)
 Winnie Tibideaux (Domonique & Monique Reynolds, Jalese & Jenelle Grays, Jessica Ann Vaughn) daughter of Sondra and Elvin (18 episodes)
 Peter Chiara (Peter Costa) Rudy's friend (13 episodes)
 Charmaine Brown (Karen Malina White) Pam's best friend (13 episodes) (later became a regular on the final season of A Different World)
 Walter Bradley, aka "Cockroach" (Carl Anthony Payne II) Theo's best friend in high school (12 episodes)
 Denny (Troy Winbush) Theo's high school, college friend (11 episodes)
 Lance Rodman (Allen Payne) Charmaine's boyfriend (11 episodes)
 Janet Meiser (Pam Potillo) Vanessa's friend (10 episodes)
 Howard (Reno Wilson) Theo's college friend (10 episodes)
 Kara (Elizabeth Narvaez) Vanessa's friend (8 episodes)
 Justine Phillips (Michelle Thomas) Theo's longtime girlfriend (8 episodes)
 Kim Ogawa (Naoka Nakagawa) Rudy's friend (7 episodes)
 Stanley (Merlin Santana) Rudy's boyfriend (7 episodes)
 Carrie Hanks (Ethel Ayler) Clair's mother (6 episodes)
 Lou Hernandez (Alex Ruiz) Theo's college friend (6 episodes)
 Robert Foreman (Dondre T. Whitfield) Vanessa's boyfriend (6 episodes)
 Dabnis Brickey (William Thomas Jr.) Vanessa's fiancé (6 episodes)
 Jeffry Engels (Wallace Shawn) the Huxtables' neighbor (5 episodes)
 Al Hanks (Joe Williams) Clair's father (4 episodes)
 Smitty (Adam Sandler) Theo's high school friend (4 episodes)
 Arthur Bartell a.k.a. "Slide" (Mushond Lee) Pam's ex-boyfriend (4 episodes)
 Mrs. McGee (Elaine Stritch) Rudy's teacher (3 episodes)
 Aaron Dexter (Seth Gilliam) Pam's boyfriend (3 episodes)
 Jade (Vanessa Estelle Williams) Theo's friend (2 episodes, season 5)
 Cheryl (Vanessa Estelle Williams) Theo's friend (2 episodes, season 7)

Notable guest stars 
 Debbie Allen as Emma ("If the Dress Fits, Wear It", season 5)
 John Amos as Dr. Herbert ("The Physical", season 5)
 Tichina Arnold as Delores ("Theo's Women", season 5)
 Angela Bassett as Mrs. Mitchell ("Mr. Quiet", season 1), and Paula ("Bookworm", season 4)
 Norman Beaton as Carleton ("There's Still No Joy in Mudville" season 7)
 U.S. Senator Bill Bradley as Cliff's teammate #1 ("The Boys of Winter", season 5)
 Sônia Braga as Anna Maria Westlake ("Mrs. Westlake" and "An Early Spring", season 2)
 Valerie Brisco-Hooks as herself ("Off to the Races", season 2)
 Roscoe Lee Browne as Dr. Foster ("The Card Game", season 2 and "Shakespeare", season 4)
 Red Buttons as Jake, owner of Jake's Appliances ("Cliff and Jake", season 7)
 Naomi Campbell as Julia ("The Birth" and "Cyranoise de Bergington", season 5)
 Betty Carter as Amanda Woods ("How Do You Get to Carnegie Hall", season 5)
 Robert Culp as Scott Kelly ("Bald and Beautiful", season 3)
 Sammy Davis Jr. as Ray Palomino ("No Way, Baby", season 5)
 Dave DeBusschere as Cliff's teammate #2 ("The Boys of Winter", season 5)
 Plácido Domingo as Alberto Santiago ("Birthday Blues", season 5)
 Teresa Edwards as Opponent #2 ("The Boys of Winter", season 5)
 Yvonne Irvin as Clair's Sister ("Clair's Sister", season 2)
 Al Freeman Jr. as Ernie Scott ("Back to the Track, Jack", season 1)
 Minnie Gentry as Gramtee ("The Storyteller", season 6)
 Dizzy Gillespie as Mr. Hampton ("Play It Again Vanessa", season 1)
 Erica Gimpel as Jennifer ("Waterworks", season 4)
 Robin Givens as Susanne ("Theo and the Older Woman", season 2)
 Pam Grier as Samantha ("Planning Parenthood", season 3)
 Moses Gunn as Joe Kendall ("Grampy and NuNu Visit the Huxtables", season 6)
 Walt Hazzard as Cliff's teammate #3 ("The Boys of Winter", season 5)
 Lena Horne as herself ("Cliff's Birthday", season 1)
 Iman as Mrs. Montgomery ("Theo and the Joint", season 1)
 Danny Kaye as Dr. Burns ("The Dentist", season 2), in one of his last TV appearances
 Alicia Keys as Maria ("Slumber Party", season 1)
 B.B. King as Riley Jackson ("Not Everybody Loves the Blues", season 6)
 LaChanze as Sylvia ("The Prom", season 4)
 Audrey Landers as Cookie Bennett ("Cliff and Jake", season 7)
 Sheldon Leonard as Dr. Wexler ("Physician of the Year," season 1)
 Nancy Lieberman as Opponent #1 ("The Boys of Winter", season 5)
 Miriam Makeba as herself ("Olivia Comes Out of the Closet", season 8)
 S. Epatha Merkerson as Book Club Member 5 ("Bookworm", season 4)
 Melba Moore as Patricia Abbott ("Twinkle, Twinkle Little Star", season 4)
 Rita Moreno as Mrs. Granger ("You Only Hurt the One You Love", season 3)
 Lou Myers as Mr. Davis ("You Only Hurt the One You Love", & "Andalusian Flu", season 3)
 Tony Orlando as Tony Castillo ("Mr. Quiet", season 1)
 Tito Puente as timbal player ("Play It Again, Russell", season 2)
 Christopher Plummer as Professor Jonathan Lawrence ("Shakespeare", season 4)
 Patricia Richardson as Mrs. Schrader ("Calling Doctor Huxtable", season 3)
 John Ritter as Ray Evans ("Total Control", season 7)
 Frank Robinson as Frank Potter ("There's Still No Joy in Mudville", season 7)
 Victoria Rowell as Paula Kendall ("Cliff's Wet Adventure", season 6)
 Howard Simms as himself ("Mr. Sandman", season 6)
 Special Ed as J.T. Freeze ("Warning: A Double-Lit Candle Can Cause a Meltdown", season 8)
 Bern Nadette Stanis as Carolyn Thompson ("Adventures in Babysitting", season 7)
 Leslie Uggams as Kris Temple ("The Return of the Clairettes", season 7)
 Blair Underwood as Denise's boyfriend (uncredited) ("Jitterbug Break", season 1), and Mark ("Theo and the Older Woman", season 2)
 Mario Van Peebles as Garvin ("Clair's Sister", season 2)
 Jim Valvano as John Velarde ("The Getaway", season 8)
 Dick Vitale as Dan Vicente ("The Getaway", season 8)
 Malinda Williams as Althea Logan ("Calling Doctor Huxtable", season 3) and Shana ("Denise Kendall: Singles Counselor", season 6)
 Nancy Wilson as Lorraine Kendall ("Grampy and NuNu Visit the Huxtables", season 6)
 Stevie Wonder as himself ("A Touch of Wonder", season 2)
 Amy Yasbeck as Alicia Evans ("Total Control", season 7)

References

Lists of American sitcom television characters
 
Cosby